is a railway station in Nan'yō, Yamagata, Japan, operated by the Yamagata Railway.

Lines
Orihata Station is a station on the Flower Nagai Line, and is located 4.4 rail kilometers from the terminus of the line at Akayu Station.

Station layout
Orihata Station has a single side platform serving traffic in both directions.  The station is unattended.

Adjacent stations

History
The station was absorbed into the JR East network upon the privatization of JNR on 1 April 1987, and became a station on the Yamagata Railway from 25 October 1988, and was renamed to its present name on the same day.

Surrounding area
 Mogami River
 Orihata River
  Route 113

External links
  Flower Nagai Line 

Railway stations in Yamagata Prefecture
Yamagata Railway Flower Nagai Line
Railway stations in Japan opened in 1959